Heritage Records may refer to: 

 Heritage Records (United States), a 1960s record label from Jerry Ross Productions
 Heritage Records (England), 1960s Blues and early Jazz label founded by Tony Standish
 BMG Heritage Records, BMG Strategic Marketing Group reissue division of Sony BMG Music Entertainment

See also 
 List of record labels